Leopoldo Reyna (born 20 December 1947) is a Mexican volleyball player. He competed in the men's tournament at the 1968 Summer Olympics.

References

External links
 

1947 births
Living people
Mexican men's volleyball players
Olympic volleyball players of Mexico
Volleyball players at the 1968 Summer Olympics
Sportspeople from Mexico City